Boris Rotenberg is the name of:

Boris Romanovich Rotenberg (born 1957), Russian businessman
Boris Borisovich Rotenberg (born 1986), Finnish-Russian footballer, son of Boris Romanovich Rotenberg